Sri S. Ramaswamy Naidu Memorial College is  a tertiary institution in Sattur in the southern Indian state of Tamil Nadu. It is named after Sri S. Ramasamy Naidu, an educator and independence leader. It is affiliated with the Madurai Kamaraj University.  It offers education is in a variety of disciplines including Chemistry, Physics, Mathematics, and Computer Science.

History
The college was established at Nagalapuram in 1970 with Thiru V. Venugopala Krishnasamy Naidu as its founding President. In 1972, the college was shifted to Sattur.

Notable alumni
 Ayyalusamy Ramamoorthy, biophysicist

External links
 

Education in Virudhunagar district
Educational institutions established in 1970
1970 establishments in Andhra Pradesh
Colleges affiliated to Madurai Kamaraj University
1972 establishments in Tamil Nadu